The 1961 New South Wales earthquake (also called the Robertson earthquake) occurred on 22 May in the Australian state of New South Wales (NSW). It reached a Richter magnitude of 5.5 and caused significant structural damage in a wide area.

Sydney suffered minimal damage from the earthquake itself, though the tremors and resulting power failures caused "considerable alarm".

Seismograms at the Sydney suburb of Riverview were used to estimate the magnitude of the earthquake. There were only three known earthquakes of comparable magnitude prior to this one, occurring in 1930, 1934 and 1938.

See also 
List of earthquakes in 1961
List of earthquakes in Australia

References 

Sources

1961 earthquakes
1961 in Australia
May 1961 events in Australia
1960s in New South Wales
Earthquakes in Australia
Disasters in New South Wales